Mies was a  tug that was built as Empire Connie in 1945 by A Hall & Co Ltd, Aberdeen for the Ministry of War Transport (MoWT). In 1946, she was sold to the Royal Netherlands Navy and renamed Mies. In 1947, she was sold to the Government of the Dutch East Indies, passing to the Indonesian Government in 1951 and then the Indonesian Navy in 1953. In 1978, she was sold and renamed Taluk Ambon, serving until 1983 when she was deleted from shipping registers.

Description
The ship was built as yard number 707 by A Hall and Co, Aberdeen. She was launched on 10 July 1945 and completed in September 1945. The ship had a GRT of 242 and a NRT of 218. The engine was No. 416, It was built by Hall & Co.

History
Empire Connie was built for the MoWT. She was placed under the management of Townsend Bros (Ferries) Ltd. The Code Letters GKGX and United Kingdom Official Number 180993 were allocated. She served in India and Singapore. In 1946, she was sold to the Royal Netherlands Navy and renamed Mies.

In 1947, or 1949, Mies was transferred to the Dutch East Indies Government. Her port of registry was Havenwezen. In 1951, Mies was transferred to the Republiek Indonesia Serikat at which time she was converted to operate on oil fuel. Her port of registry was changed to Jakarta. In 1953, Mies was transferred to the Indonesian Navy, serving until 1958 when she was transferred back to the Indonesian Government.

In 1978, Mies was sold to the Port Authority of Tanjung Priok and was renamed Taluk Ambon. She served until 1983, being deleted from Lloyd's Register in that year. It's unknown whetwhr she was scrapped or preserved.

References

1945 ships
Ships built in Aberdeen
Tugboats of the United Kingdom
Ministry of War Transport ships
Empire ships
Steamships of the United Kingdom
Merchant ships of the United Kingdom
Naval ships of the Netherlands
Steamships of the Netherlands
Merchant ships of the Dutch East Indies
Steamships of the Dutch East Indies
Auxiliary ships of the Indonesian Navy
Merchant ships of Indonesia
Steamships of Indonesia